Dylan Phythian (born 19 August 1995) is an Australian professional rugby league footballer who plays as a  and . He previously for the Newcastle Knights in the NRL.

Background
Phythian was born in Newcastle, New South Wales, Australia.

He played his junior rugby league for the Western Suburbs Rosellas, Lakes United and Belmont South Rabbitohs, before being signed by the Newcastle Knights.

Playing career

2015
In 2015, Phythian played for the Newcastle Knights' NYC team, before being promoted to their New South Wales Cup team during the year.

2016
In round 25 of the 2016 NRL season, Phythian made his NRL debut for the Knights against the South Sydney Rabbitohs, scoring a try. In November, he re-signed with the Knights on a 1-year contract until the end of 2017.

2017
While playing fullback in round 1 of the 2017 season against the New Zealand Warriors, Phythian suffered a season-ending injury, tearing the anterior cruciate ligament in his left knee. In September, he had his Knights contract extended until the end of 2018.

2018
On 27 March, Phythian had his contract terminated by the Knights after he returned a second positive test for social drugs, the first test remaining anonymous under the NRL's rules, with the second positive test automatically incurring a 12-match suspension.

Phythian made his return to the field in June for Lakes United in the Newcastle Rugby League. Less than a week later, he made a mid-season move to the Burleigh Bears in the Queensland Cup.

2019
In February, Phythian was given the chance to train and trial with the Gold Coast Titans during the pre-season.

In September, Phythian played five-eighth in the 2019 Intrust Super Cup Grand Final defeating Wynnum Manly. He also played in the State Championship Grand Final against the NSW Instrust Super Cup winners Newtown Jets.

2020
In 2020, Phythian played for the Blacktown Workers.

2021
In 2021, Phythian returned to Newcastle to play for the Central Newcastle Butcher Boys in the Newcastle Rugby League.

2022
In 2022, Phythian returned to the Knights on a train and trial contract and played for their NSW Cup team.

References

External links

Newcastle Knights profile

1995 births
Living people
Australian rugby league players
Burleigh Bears players
Lakes United Seagulls players
Newcastle Knights players
Rugby league five-eighths
Rugby league fullbacks
Rugby league players from Newcastle, New South Wales
Western Suburbs Rosellas players